Samuel Price Carson (January 22, 1798 – November 2, 1838) was an American political leader and farmer in both North Carolina and Texas. He served as U.S. congressional representative from North Carolina.

North Carolina 

He was born at Carson House, Pleasant Gardens, in what is now McDowell County, North Carolina, and studied under private tutors in Pleasant Gardens.

He engaged in agricultural pursuits and was a member of the North Carolina Senate 1822-1824.  Carson was elected as a Jacksonian to the Nineteenth and to the three succeeding Congresses (March 4, 1825 – March 3, 1833), but lost re-election in 1833.  He was then again elected to the state senate in 1834 and served as a delegate to the State constitutional convention in 1835.

Robert Brank Vance was mortally wounded by Samuel Price Carson, who challenged him to a duel, fought at Saluda Gap, North Carolina, because of a derogatory remark made during the 1827 campaign.

Texas / Arkansas 
By 1836, he had moved to Texas, and was elected by his neighbors to the Convention of 1836, where he signed both the Texas Declaration of Independence and the Constitution of the Republic of Texas. The convention also established an interim or acting government for the republic, which was still at war in rebellion against Mexico. They considered him for president, but elected David G. Burnet, instead, by six votes more than Carson received. In a later vote they elected Carson the Secretary of State. President Burnet sent him to Washington, DC, to lead a team to negotiate for recognition of and aid for Texas, then later named James Collinsworth to replace him as secretary of state. When Carson learned of this from a newspaper, he simply went home.

Later, when borders were formalized, Carson's home was identified as part of Miller County, Arkansas. He died in Hot Springs, Arkansas, and is buried in the Government Cemetery there.

References

External links
U.S. Congress Biographical Directory entry

|-

1798 births
1838 deaths
19th-century American politicians
American duellists
Jacksonian members of the United States House of Representatives from North Carolina
North Carolina state senators
People from McDowell County, North Carolina
People of the Texas Revolution
Secretaries of State of Texas
Signers of the Texas Declaration of Independence